Madan may refer to:

Places

Armenia
Kapan, a city in Armenia, formerly Madan
Madan, a small village above Alaverdi in Lori Marz

Bulgaria
Madan, Montana Province, a village in the Boychinovtsi municipality of northwestern Bulgaria
Madan, Smolyan Province, a town and municipality in southern Bulgaria

Iran
Madan, Chaharmahal and Bakhtiari, a village in Chaharmahal and Bakhtiari Province, Iran
Madan, Fars, a village in Fars Province, Iran
Madan, Kerman, a village in Kerman Province, Iran
Radeh-ye Madan, also known as Madan, a village in Khuzestan Province, Iran
Madan, Qazvin, a village in Qazvin Province, Iran
Madan, Razavi Khorasan, a village in Razavi Khorasan Province, Iran
Madan-e Olya, a village in Razavi Khorasan Province, Iran
Madan-e Sofla, a village in Razavi Khorasan Province, Iran

Syria
Ma'adan, a town in central Syria, also known as Madan

People
Madan (surname)
Madan (film director), Telugu film writer and director
Madan Puri (1915–1985), Indian actor
Madan Rai, thirteenth century minister of Gour (northern Sylhet)

Other uses
Madan (people), an ethnic group from southern Iraq
Medan (son of Abraham)
"Madan" (song), a 2003 song by Martin Solveig and Salif Keita
Sudalai Madan, a popular non-Vedic deity in southern India
Mad'an (slave)

See also
 Madani (disambiguation)
 Madhan (disambiguation)